Kuny may refer to the following places in Poland:
Kuny, Lower Silesian Voivodeship (south-west Poland)
Kuny, Greater Poland Voivodeship (west-central Poland)